Calmar/Wizard Lake Aerodrome  is located  south southeast of Calmar, near Wizard Lake, Alberta, Canada.

References

Registered aerodromes in Alberta
County of Wetaskiwin No. 10